The 2015 Macedonian Supercup was the third and last Macedonian Football Supercup, an annual Macedonian football match played between the winners of the previous season's First League and Macedonian Cup. The game will be played between Rabotnički, who beat Teteks to win the 2015 Macedonian Cup Final, and Vardar, champions of the 2014–15 First League. It was played at Philip II Arena, Skopje and was won by Vardar by 4–3 on penalties after the match was ended 1–1 after the regular and extra time.

Match details

References

2015
Supercup